Regal Lager, Inc. is a distributor of baby and children's products to both the United States and Canada, and is located in Kennesaw, Georgia. Regal Lager, Inc. works with companies outside the United States, and is known in the baby industry as a push-distributor as they not only provide distribution for their products, but marketing and advertising as well. They are best known for establishing the Baby Björn baby carrier brand in the United States throughout the 1990s. The company won The Swedish Trade Council's annual achievement award for Superb Consumer Market Adaptability in North America in 2001. Today Regal Lager, Inc. is currently responsible for the distribution of the Love To Dream, Dekor, Lascal, Qdos and Nomi brands.

History 
Regal Lager began as a small, family owned business started by husband and wife team of Bengt Lager and Luanne Whiting-Lager in the basement of their Georgia home in 1991.

The idea of starting a business in the juvenile products industry began when the Lagers had their first child in Sweden. Based on the positive feedback they received from friends and family members in the United States, they decided to bring their well-designed baby products from Sweden to the United States.

Upon the birth of their second daughter three years later, they moved forward by researching business trends in the United States and as a result, they decided to start a mail order catalog business in the United States to sell Swedish products. However, after much consideration and advice from industry leaders, the two decided to take on the role as distributor. 
One of Regal Lager’s first manufacturers was the Swedish brand: Baby Björn; which they worked to build it to the popularity it enjoys in the United States.

The small family business grew to a large family business now with an  warehouse in Kennesaw, GA, 16 full-time employees, and six international brands.

Awards and recognition 
 Safe Kids Cobb County Corporate Partner 2010
 Bambino Mio Distributor of the Year, Best Marketing Initiative 2009/2010
 Bambino Mio Distributor of the Year, Best Marketing Initiative 2008/2009
 2008 Honoree at First Candle's Annual Benefit Event, The Windflower Ball
 Owner Bengt Lager served as President for the Juvenile Products Manufacturers Association (JPMA) from 2004—2005
 Regal Lager, Inc. wins the 2003 JPMA Innovation Award for the Baby Bjorn Active Carrier
 The Swedish Trade Council’s annual achievement award for Superb Consumer Market Adaptability in North America, 2000

References

External links 
 
 Bengt Lager, owner of Regal Lager, Inc., receives mention for his role as chairman of JPMA (Juvenile Products Manufacturing Association)
 Bengt Lager's message to the industry as JPMA ChairmanJuvenile Industry Magazine Kid's Today writes about the Golden Carrot Award received by Regal Lager, Inc.

Distribution companies of the United States